The Bahraini FA Cup is a Bahrain knockout tournament in men's association football.

Previous winners
2000 : Al-Riffa (known as West Riffa) 3–0 Al Ahli
2001 : Al-Riffa
2002 : not held
2003 : Busaiteen 0–0 Al-Riffa (aet, 5–4 pen)
2004 : Al-Riffa 3–1 Busaiteen
2005 : Al-Muharraq 2–1 Busaiteen
2006 : not held
2007 : Al Ahli 1–1 Al-Najma (aet, 4–3 pen)
2008 : not held
2009 : Al-Muharraq 1–0 Al-Najma
2010 : not held
2011 : not held
2012 : not held
2013 : not held
2014 : Al-Riffa 2–0 Bahrain SC
2015 : Al-Hidd 2–0 East Riffa
2016 : Al-Ahli 1–1 Malkiya SCC (aet, 3–1 pen)
2017 : Al-Hidd 1–1 Malkiya SCC (aet, 8–7 pen)
2018 : not held
2019 : East Riffa 3–1 Al-Ahli SC
2020 : Muharraq SC 4–1 Busaiteen
2021 : Muharraq SC 2–1 East Riffa
2022 : Muharraq SC 1–1 Al-Hidd (aet, 1–0 pen)

Top-Performing Clubs

References
 Bahrain - List of Cup Winners (RSSSF)
 Bahrain Cup summary (flashscore)
  (livescores)
 Federation Cup (Soccerway)

 
FA
National association football cups
Recurring sporting events established in 2000
2000 establishments in Bahrain